Vladimir Zayets (born 4 May 1981 in Baku, Azerbaijan SSR) is a Paralympian athlete from Azerbaijan competing mainly in category F12 triple jump events.

He competed in the 2008 Summer Paralympics in Beijing, China. There he won a bronze medal in the men's F12 triple jump event.

References

External links
 

Paralympic athletes of Azerbaijan
Athletes (track and field) at the 2008 Summer Paralympics
Athletes (track and field) at the 2012 Summer Paralympics
Paralympic bronze medalists for Azerbaijan
Paralympic silver medalists for Azerbaijan
Azerbaijani male triple jumpers
Living people
Medalists at the 2008 Summer Paralympics
Medalists at the 2012 Summer Paralympics
Year of birth missing (living people)
Paralympic medalists in athletics (track and field)
20th-century Azerbaijani people
21st-century Azerbaijani people
Visually impaired triple jumpers
Paralympic triple jumpers